Longitarsus ferruginipennis is a species of beetle in the subfamily Galerucinae that is endemic to Spain.

References

F
Beetles described in 1910
Endemic fauna of Spain